Tear Film & Ocular Surface Society (TFOS) is a  501(c)(3) nonprofit organization founded in 2000 focused on facilitating consensus and standardization on ophthalmological research related to ocular surface subjects like tear film, dry eye, meibomian gland dysfunction and contact lens discomfort. TFOS organize workshops and produce reports which are then translated to different languages.

Workshops
 TFOS International Dry Eye WorkShop (DEWS™) 2007
 TFOS International Workshop on Meibomian Gland Dysfunction (MGD) 2010
 TFOS International Workshop on Contact Lens Discomfort 2013
 TFOS Dry Eye WorkShop II (TFOS DEWS II™) 2017

External links 
 Official site

References 

 Ophthalmology